Pāṇi is a surname used in India, found often in the state of Odisha (formerly Orissa). The surname Pāṇi is widely used in Orissa, Madhya Pradesh, and a large part of eastern and central India. This surname is used by Brahmins whose root is claimed to be traced to Ujjain of Madhya Pradesh and to the period of Kalidasa.

History
There are two stories how this surname (or caste name) came about. The first one says the great grammar pundit Pāṇini is the ancestor of Pāṇis, and the other story is that a king of Kalinga conferred the title Pāṇi to Brahmins who could easily memorize all of the Vedas.

It is widely believed that the Brahmins who were primarily occupied with writing scriptures and preserving it were known by the surname Pāṇi. Unlike other Brahmin communities, these Brahmins practiced martial arts and participated in wars.

Pani reached their zenith and were revered as ministers in the period of king Vikramaditya (1st century AD).

Pani migrated to Orissa in the 12th century AD after king Jajati Keshari invited them for a yajna that was held to honour Shiva.

Pani families in Purulia district have been Zamindars (in Chakradharpur, Puri, Barabazar.

Some Pāṇis migrated inland to the tribal areas of Jharkhand and settled during the Mughal period (17th century). (The migrants' descendants still identify themselves as residents of Orissa.) There are a few Pāṇis from this migratory group in Jhargram in west bengal and in western Odisha.

Notable people 
Notable people with the surname include:
 Baishnaba Pani (1882–1956), Indian writer and theatre director
 Biswamohan Pani, former design engineer at Intel
 Bhavna Pani, Indian actress, model, and dancer
 Ravi Narayan Pani, Indian politician
 Uday Shankar Pani, Indian filmmaker

References

Surnames
Indian surnames